Rowe is a common surname; it has also been used as the name for several places. It is of Norman origin, Rous or Le Roux', from the French rouge "red." It has strong links to northern France and Cornwall, where it remains a common surname to this day. It first appeared in England in 1066 after the Norman Invasion, when lands were granted by the first Norman King William I to Turchil Le Roux and Alan Rufus.

A–K
Alan Rowe, people of the same name:
Alan Rowe (1926–2000), New Zealand-born English actor
Alan Rowe (1891–1968), British archaeologist
Albert Rowe (politician) (1872–1955), Australian politician
Albert Percival Rowe (1898–1976), British physicist and radar pioneer
Alex Rowe (born 1966), British member of the French Foreign Legion
Alfred Rowe (1837–1921), English clergyman, educationalist and cricketer
Andrew Rowe (1935–2008), British politician
Anthony Rowe (1640s–1704), English politician, MP for Penryn, Mitchell and Stockbridge
Antony Rowe (1924–2003), English rower also known as Tony Rowe
Arthur Rowe, people of the same name:
Arthur Rowe (1906–1993), English footballer
Arthur Rowe (1936–2003), English shot putter
Bernard Rowe (1904–1986), English freestyle wrestler
Brad Rowe (born 1970), American film and television actor
Charles Rowe, people of the same name:
Charles Rowe (born 1951), British cricketer
Charles Henry Rowe (1893–1943), Irish mathematician
Christopher Rowe, people of the same name:
Christopher Rowe, American record producer
Christopher Rowe (born 1944), British classicist
Christopher Rowe (born 1969), American author
Clive Rowe (born 1964), British actor
Colin Davies Rowe (1911–1970) lawyer and politician in South Australia
Colin Rowe (2006-2023) the funniest guy he knows
Curtis Rowe (born 1949), American basketball player
Danielle Rowe (born 1982), Australian ballet dancer
Dave Rowe (1854–1930), American baseball player
Deborah Jeanne Rowe (born 1958), ex-wife of pop singer Michael Jackson
Dick Rowe (1921–1986), British music executive and producer
Dorothy Rowe (1930–2019), Australian psychologist and author
Doug Rowe (1909–1978), English footballer with Luton Town, Lincoln City and Southampton 
Elizabeth Rowe, people of the same name:
Elizabeth Singer Rowe (1674–1737), English poet
Elizabeth Rowe (born 1974), American flutist
Emile Smith Rowe (born 2000), English footballer
F. J. Rowe (1844–1909), Professor of English Literature at the Presidency College in Calcutta, India
Franklin Rowe, American fashion designer
G. Steven Rowe (born 1953), American politician commonly known as Steve Rowe
Genevieve Rowe, (1908–1995) American singer
George Rowe (1894–1975), American character actor 
Gordon Rowe (1915–1995), New Zealand cricketer
Hahn Rowe, US musician
Hansford Rowe, people of the same name:
Hansford Rowe (1924–2017), American actor
Hansford Rowe, American bass guitarist
Harris Rowe (1923–2013), American politician, lawyer, and businessman
Henrietta Gould Rowe (1834/35–1910), American litterateur and author
Henry Rowe (died 1612), Lord Mayor of London 
Ira DeCordova Rowe (1928–2004), Jamaican jurist
Jack Rowe (1856–1911), American baseball player
James N. Rowe (1938–1989), American military officer also known as Nick Rowe
Jason Rowe (born 1969), British pop/soul singer
Jessica Rowe (born 1970), Australian TV presenter
John Rowe, people of the same name:
John Rowe (1715–1787), British American property developer and merchant
John Howland Rowe (1918–2004), American archaeologist and anthropologist
Joshua Brooking Rowe (1837–1908), English antiquarian and naturalist
Keith Rowe (born 1940), British musician and artist
Kurtis Rowe (born 1993), New Zealand rugby league player

L–W
Lawrence Rowe (born 1949), West Indian cricketer
Len Rowe (1938–2009), English teacher and sportsman
Luke Rowe (born 1990), racing cyclist
Marisa Rowe (born 1963), Australian basketball player
Matthew Rowe (cyclist) (born 1988), racing cyclist
Michael Rowe/Mike Rowe, people of the same name:
Michael Rowe (born 1960), American television writer for Futurama
Michael Rowe (born 1970), Australian film director based in Mexico
Michael Rowe (born 1962), Canadian author and journalist
Mike Rowe (born 1962), American television host and narrator
Mike Rowe (born 1965), Canadian retired professional ice hockey player
Mike Rowe, American stock car racing driver
Mike Rowe, defendant in the case of Microsoft vs. MikeRoweSoft
Mike Rowe, keyboard player in Oasis and Noel Gallagher's High Flying Birds
Misty Rowe (born 1952), actress on Hee Haw
Nicholas Rowe, people of the same name:
Nicholas Rowe (born 1966), Scottish actor
Nicholas Rowe (1674–1718), English dramatist, poet and miscellaneous writer
Noel Rowe (1951–2007), Australian poet
Normie Rowe (born 1947), Australian musician
Patrick Rowe (born 1969), American football player
Patricia "Pat" Rowe (born 1939), Australian basketball player and captain
R. Kerry Rowe (born 1951), Canadian civil engineer
Raymond Rowe (born 1984), American professional wrestler
Richard Yates Rowe (1888–1973), American politician and businessman
Robert Rowe (born 1938), American attorney and Republican member of the Pennsylvania House of Representatives
Russell Rowe (1914–1994), Canadian politician
Schoolboy Rowe (1910–1961), American baseball player
Solána Rowe (born 1989), American singer known professionally as SZA
Tom Rowe, people of the same name:
Tom Rowe (1950–2004), singer and bass player
Tom Rowe (born 1956), retired hockey player and coach
Tracy-Ann Rowe (born 1985), Jamaican sprinter
Wallace P. Rowe (1926–1983), American virologist and cancer researcher
William Rowe, people of the same name:
William Earl Rowe (1894–1984), Canadian politician and 20th Lieutenant Governor of Ontario
William L. Rowe (1931–2015), American professor and philosopher of religion
William Rowe (died 1593), Lord Mayor of London

See also
Roe (surname)

References

English-language surnames